A finite difference is a mathematical expression of the form . The approximation of derivatives by finite differences plays a central role in finite difference methods for the numerical solution of differential equations, especially boundary value problems.

The difference operator, commonly denoted  is the operator that maps a function  to the function  defined by

A difference equation is a functional equation that involves the finite difference operator in the same way as a differential equation involves derivatives. There are many similarities between difference equations and differential equations, specially in the solving methods. Certain recurrence relations can be written as difference equations by replacing iteration notation with finite differences.

In numerical analysis, finite differences are widely used for approximating derivatives, and the term "finite difference" is often used as an abbreviation of "finite difference approximation of derivatives". Finite difference approximations are finite difference quotients in the terminology employed above.

Finite differences trace their origins back to one of Jost Bürgi's algorithms and work by others including Isaac Newton. The formal calculus of finite differences can be viewed as an alternative to the calculus of infinitesimals.

Basic types

Three basic types are commonly considered: forward, backward, and central finite differences.

A forward difference, denoted  of a function  is a function defined as

Depending on the application, the spacing  may be variable or constant.  When omitted,  is taken to be 1; that is, 

Finally, the central difference is given by

Relation with derivatives 

Finite difference is often used as an approximation of the derivative, typically in numerical differentiation.

The derivative of a function  at a point   is defined by the limit.

If  has a fixed (non-zero) value instead of approaching zero, then the right-hand side of the above equation would be written

Hence, the forward difference divided by  approximates the derivative when   is small. The error in this approximation can be derived from Taylor's theorem. Assuming that  is twice differentiable, we have

The same formula holds for the backward difference:

However, the central (also called centered) difference yields a more accurate approximation. If  is three times differentiable,

The main problem with the central difference method, however, is that oscillating functions can yield zero derivative. See also Symmetric derivative

Authors for whom finite differences mean finite difference approximations define the forward/backward/central differences as the quotients given in this section (instead of employing the definitions given in the previous section).

Higher-order differences
  

In an analogous way, one can obtain finite difference approximations to higher order derivatives and differential operators.

Second-order central

Similarly we can apply other differencing formulas in a recursive manner.

Second order forward

Second order backward

More generally, the  th order forward, backward, and central differences are given by, respectively,

Forward

Backward

Central

Note that the central difference will, for odd , have   multiplied by non-integers. This is often a problem because it amounts to changing the interval of discretization.

Forward differences applied to a sequence are sometimes called the binomial transform of the sequence, and have a number of interesting combinatorial properties. Forward differences may be evaluated using the Nörlund–Rice integral. The integral representation for these types of series is interesting, because the integral can often be evaluated using asymptotic expansion or saddle-point techniques; by contrast, the forward difference series can be extremely hard to evaluate numerically, because the binomial coefficients grow rapidly for large .

The relationship of these higher-order differences with the respective derivatives is  straightforward,

Higher-order differences can also be used to construct better approximations. As mentioned above, the first-order difference approximates the first-order derivative up to a term of order . However, the combination

approximates  up to a term of order . This can be proven by expanding the above expression in Taylor series, or by using the calculus of finite differences, explained below.

If necessary, the finite difference can be centered about any point by mixing forward, backward, and central differences.

Polynomials

After  pairwise differences, the following result can be achieved, where  is a real number marking the arithmetic difference:

Only the coefficient of the highest-order term remains.

Inductive proof

Base case
Let  be a polynomial of degree :

This proves it for the base case.

Step case
Let  be a polynomial of degree  where  and the coefficient of the highest-order term be . Assuming the following holds true for all polynomials of degree :

Let  be a polynomial of degree . With one pairwise difference:

Given the assumption above and  pairwise differences (resulting in a total of  pairwise differences for ), it can be found that:

This completes the proof.

Application
This identity can be used to find the lowest-degree polynomial that intercepts a number of points  where the difference on the x-axis from one point to the next is a constant . For example, given the following points:

We can use a differences table, where for all cells to the right of the first , the following relation to the cells in the column immediately to the left exists for a cell , with the top-leftmost cell being at coordinate :

To find the first term, the following table can be used:

This arrives at a constant . Given the number of pairwise differences needed to reach the constant, it can be surmised this is a polynomial of degree . Thus, using the identity above:

Then, subtracting out the first term, which lowers the polynomial's degree, and finding the finite difference again:

Here, the constant is achieved after only 2 pairwise differences, thus the following result:

Moving on to the next term, by subtracting out the second term:

Thus the constant is achieved after only 1 pairwise difference:

Subtracting out the third term:

Without any pairwise differences, it is found that the 4th and final term of the polynomial is the constant . Thus, the lowest-degree polynomial intercepting all the points in the first table is found:

Arbitrarily sized kernels

Using linear algebra one can construct finite difference approximations which utilize an arbitrary number of points to the left and a (possibly different) number of points to the right of the evaluation point, for any order derivative. This involves solving a linear system such that the Taylor expansion of the sum of those points around the evaluation point best approximates the Taylor expansion of the desired derivative. Such formulas can be represented graphically on a hexagonal or diamond-shaped grid.

This is useful for differentiating a function on a grid, where, as one approaches the edge of the grid, one must sample fewer and fewer points on one side.

The details are outlined in these notes.

The Finite Difference Coefficients Calculator constructs finite difference approximations for non-standard (and even non-integer) stencils given an arbitrary stencil and a desired derivative order.

Properties
 For all positive  and  
 Leibniz rule:

In differential equations

An important application of finite differences is in numerical analysis, especially in numerical differential equations, which aim at the numerical solution of ordinary and partial differential equations. The idea is to replace the derivatives appearing in the differential equation by finite differences that approximate them. The resulting methods are called finite difference methods.

Common applications of the finite difference method are in computational science and engineering disciplines, such as thermal engineering, fluid mechanics, etc.

Newton's series
The Newton series consists of the terms of the Newton forward difference equation, named after Isaac Newton;  in essence, it is  the Newton interpolation formula, first published in his Principia Mathematica in 1687,  namely the discrete analog of the continuous Taylor expansion,

which holds for any polynomial function  and for many (but not all)  analytic functions. (It does not hold when  is exponential type . Yet clearly, the sine function is not zero.) Here, the expression

is the binomial coefficient, and

is the "falling factorial" or "lower factorial", while  the empty product  is defined to be 1.

Note the formal correspondence of this result to Taylor's theorem.  Historically, this, as well as the Chu–Vandermonde identity,  

(following from it, and corresponding to the binomial theorem),  are included in the observations that matured to the system of umbral calculus.

Newton series expansions can be superior to Taylor series expansions when applied to discrete quantities like quantum spins (see Holstein–Primakoff transformation), bosonic operator functions or discrete counting statistics.

the series of products,

and the resulting polynomial is the scalar product,
 .

In analysis with -adic numbers, Mahler's theorem states that the assumption that  is a polynomial function can be weakened all the way to the assumption that  is merely continuous.

Carlson's theorem provides necessary and sufficient conditions for a Newton series to be unique, if it exists. However, a Newton series does not, in general, exist.

The Newton series, together with the Stirling series and the Selberg series, is a special case of the general difference series, all of which are defined in terms of suitably scaled forward differences.

In a compressed and slightly more general form and equidistant nodes the formula reads

Calculus of finite differences

This operator amounts to

The difference operator  is a linear operator, as such it satisfies .

It also satisfies a special Leibniz rule indicated above,
.  Similar statements hold for the backward and central differences.

where  denotes the continuum derivative operator, mapping  to its derivative . The expansion is valid when both sides act on analytic functions, for sufficiently small . Thus, and formally inverting the exponential yields 

This formula holds in the sense that both operators give the same result when applied to a polynomial.

Even for analytic functions, the series on the right is not guaranteed to converge; it may be an asymptotic series. However, it can be used to obtain more accurate approximations for the derivative. For instance, retaining the first two terms of the series yields the second-order approximation to  mentioned at the end of the section Higher-order differences.

The analogous formulas for the backward and central difference operators are

The calculus of finite differences is related to the umbral calculus of combinatorics. This remarkably systematic correspondence is due to the identity of the commutators of the umbral quantities to their continuum analogs ( limits),

A large number of formal differential relations of standard calculus involving 
functions  thus map systematically to umbral finite-difference analogs involving .

For instance, the umbral analog of a monomial  is a generalization of the above falling factorial (Pochhammer k-symbol),  
 
so that 

hence the above Newton interpolation formula (by matching coefficients in the expansion of an arbitrary function  in such symbols), and so on.

For example, the umbral sine is

As in the continuum limit, the eigenfunction of   also happens to be an exponential,

and hence Fourier sums of continuum functions are readily mapped to umbral Fourier sums faithfully, i.e., involving the same Fourier coefficients multiplying these umbral basis exponentials.  This umbral exponential thus amounts to the exponential generating function of the Pochhammer symbols.

Thus, for instance,  the Dirac delta function maps to its umbral correspondent, the cardinal sine function,

and so forth.  Difference equations can often be solved with techniques very similar to those for solving differential equations.

The inverse operator of the forward difference operator, so then the umbral integral, is the indefinite sum or antidifference operator.

Rules for calculus of finite difference operators
Analogous to rules for finding the derivative, we have:
 Constant rule: If  is a constant, then

 Product rule:

 Quotient rule:

or

 Summation rules:

See references.

Generalizations

A generalized finite difference is usually defined as  where  is its coefficient vector. An infinite difference is a further generalization, where the finite sum above is replaced by an infinite series. Another way of generalization is making coefficients  depend on point : , thus considering weighted finite difference. Also one may make the step  depend on point : . Such generalizations are useful for constructing different modulus of continuity.
The generalized difference can be seen as the polynomial rings . It leads to difference algebras.
Difference operator generalizes to Möbius inversion over a partially ordered set.
As a convolution operator: Via the formalism of incidence algebras, difference operators and other Möbius inversion can be represented by convolution with a function on the poset, called the Möbius function ; for the difference operator,  is the sequence .

Multivariate finite differences

Finite differences can be considered in more than one variable. They are analogous to partial derivatives in several variables.

Some partial derivative approximations are:

See also

References 

 Richardson, C. H. (1954): An Introduction to the Calculus of Finite Differences (Van Nostrand (1954) online copy
 Mickens, R. E. (1991): Difference Equations: Theory and Applications (Chapman and Hall/CRC)

External links 
 
 Table of useful finite difference formula generated using Mathematica
 D. Gleich (2005),  Finite Calculus: A Tutorial for Solving Nasty Sums
 Discrete Second Derivative from Unevenly Spaced Points

 
Numerical differential equations
Mathematical analysis
Factorial and binomial topics
Linear operators in calculus
Numerical analysis
Non-Newtonian calculus